William Burrows may refer to:

 William Ward Burrows I (Marine Lieutenant Colonel) (1768–1805), second Commandant of the Marine Corps
 William Ward Burrows II (Navy Lieutenant) (1785–1813), Colonel's son
 William E. Burrows, co-founder of the Alliance to Rescue Civilization
 William Eugene Burrows, birth name of Billy Drago (1945–2019), American actor
 William Burrows (cricketer) (1844 – unknown), English cricketer

See also
William Burroughs (disambiguation)
William Burrough (disambiguation)